This is a list of supermarket chains in Botswana.

 Checkers
 Choppies
 Friendly (OK franchise)
 Megamart
 OK Foods Supermarket
 OK Grocer
 OK Minimark
 OK Value
 Pick 'n Pay
 Sefalana
Shoppers
 Shoprite
 Spar
 USave
 Woolworths

See also 

 Shongwe Ye Mabuwa

References

External links 

Botswana
Botswana
Supermarket